Mezmerize is the fourth studio album by American heavy metal band System of a Down, released on May 17, 2005, by American Recordings and Columbia Records. Upon its release, the album received acclaim from critics. The album sold over 450,000 copies in its first week (over 200,000 more than Toxicity did), and immediately topped the Billboard 200.

At a length of just over 36 minutes, Mezmerize is the band's shortest studio album.

Background 
Despite the time difference between releases, Mezmerize and Hypnotize were recorded within the same time frame. The album features guitarist Daron Malakian sharing most of the vocal work with vocalist Serj Tankian, splitting the vocals at least halfway on many of the tracks. In 2018, Malakian and Tankian both independently revealed that at the time of recording the two albums, Tankian was almost out of the band. According to Tankian, this was because of differences in creative input and financial revenue split.

Malakian wrote "Old School Hollywood" after playing in a celebrity baseball game for charity. The song mentions Tony Danza and Frankie Avalon, who also played in the game.

In "Radio/Video", there are lines referring to two people named Danny and Lisa. Malakian commented on the song to Revolver magazine:

In the same interview, Daron Malakian talked about "Violent Pornography"'s "non-stop disco" lines:

The Japanese version of the album contains alternate mixes of "Soldier Side (Intro)" and "Lost in Hollywood", the former with additional strings and the latter containing slightly different background vocals, while the leaked MP3 version of "Cigaro" contains a 4-stick hit intro not present in the retail version. The album artwork is done by Vartan Malakian, the father of Daron Malakian.

Reception

Mezmerize was acclaimed by critics, scoring 85 at Metacritic based on 19 reviews, indicating "universal acclaim". The album debuted at number one in at least 12 countries, including the US Billboard 200, with 453,000 copies, and has since been certified Platinum by the RIAA. It was chosen as one of Amazon.com's Top 100 Editor's Picks of 2005. The hit single "B.Y.O.B." won a Grammy Award in 2006 for Best Hard Rock Performance.

Track listing
All lyrics written by Daron Malakian and Serj Tankian, except where noted. All music written by Malakian, except "Question!", written by Malakian and Tankian.

Personnel

System of a Down
 Serj Tankian – vocals, keyboards, acoustic guitar on "Question!" (uncredited)
 Daron Malakian – vocals, guitars, bass (uncredited)
 Shavo Odadjian – bass
 John Dolmayan – drums, percussion

Vocals
 "Soldier Side" - Intro: Daron Malakian and Serj Tankian (both main)
 "B.Y.O.B.": Tankian (main), Malakian (second voice)
 "Revenga": Tankian (main), Malakian (second voice)
 "Cigaro": Tankian (main), Malakian (second voice)
 "Radio/Video": Malakian and Tankian (both main)
 "This Cocaine Makes Me Feel Like I'm on this Song": Tankian
 "Violent Pornography": Malakian and Tankian (both main)
 "Question!": Tankian (main), Malakian (backing vocals)
 "Sad Statue": Malakian and Tankian (both main)
 "Old School Hollywood": Malakian and Tankian (both main)
 "Lost in Hollywood": Malakian (main) and Tankian (second voice)

Production
 Rick Rubin – production
 Andy Wallace – mixing
 David Schiffman – engineering
 Jason Lader – editing
 Dana Neilsen – editing
 Phillip Broussard – engineering assistance
 John O'Mahony – Pro Tools engineering
 Steve Sisco – mixing assistance
 Joe Peluso – mixing assistance

Additional personnel
 Marc Mann – string arrangements
 Vartan Malakian – artwork
 Brandy Flower – graphic design

Charts

Weekly charts

Year-end charts

Certifications

References

2005 albums
Albums produced by Daron Malakian
Albums produced by Rick Rubin
American Recordings (record label) albums
Columbia Records albums
System of a Down albums
Albums recorded at The Mansion (recording studio)